Automated Fingerprint Identification System (AFIS) can refer to
 Automated fingerprint identification systems in general
 Integrated Automated Fingerprint Identification System is the national system used by police departments and United States federal agencies such as the CIA and the FBI